Winx Club is an Italian-American animated television series co-produced by Rainbow SpA and Nickelodeon, which are both part of Paramount Global. The show was created by Iginio Straffi. It follows a group of fairy warriors called the Winx as they enroll in Alfea College and learn to fight mythical villains. 

From the beginning of the show's development, Iginio Straffi planned an overarching plot that would conclude after three seasons. A feature-length film followed the third season, intended to wrap up the series' plot as the fairies graduate from Alfea College. In 2008, Straffi made the decision to extend the original series with a fourth season, citing its increasing popularity. During the production of the fourth season, the American company Viacom (owner of Nickelodeon) engaged in a "long courtship" with the Rainbow studio. Viacom became a co-owner of Rainbow to produce their own episodes of Winx Club.

In 2010, Viacom announced that "Nickelodeon is teaming up with the original creator to present an all-new Winx Club." Viacom's Nickelodeon Animation Studio started production on a revived series, in which the Winx are once again students at Alfea, as they were before their graduation in the original show. The Nickelodeon revival began with four television specials that summarize the first two seasons of the original series. After the specials, Viacom's brand-new fifth, sixth, and seventh seasons were broadcast on Nickelodeon networks worldwide ahead of the Italian broadcasts.

Winx Club employs a serial format, with each episode contributing to the overall storyline. Episodes are written with two stories in mind: the longer narrative arc that lasts for tens of episodes and a subplot which concludes at the end of the 22-minute runtime. This episode structure was modeled on those of teen dramas and American comics.

Overview

Original series
When Iginio Straffi began developing Winx Club at the Rainbow studio, he outlined the plot to last three seasons (78 episodes). In 2007, Straffi explained that "the Winx saga was planned in detail from the beginning. And it will not last forever." The third season follows the fairies' last year at Alfea College, during which they earn their final fairy form, Enchantix. In 2008, Iginio Straffi chose to continue the story for a fourth season. During the fourth season's development, Viacom began discussions to become a co-owner of the Rainbow studio and produce a revival series, which began with a retelling of the first two original seasons.

Pilot (2001) 

The pilot episode for the series, then under the working title Magic Bloom, featured the original five Winx members in attires similar to those of traditional European fairies. It was produced over a period of twelve months and was test-screened in 2002. Upon its completion, Straffi was unsatisfied with the pilot and doubted that it would succeed if aired. In a 2016 interview, Straffi recalled that it "looked like just another Japanese-style cartoon ... but nothing like [the modern] Winx." Straffi's team heavily reworked the pilot's visual style before starting work on a full season, leaving the original pilot unaired. Portions of the pilot were presented at the Lucca Comics & Games convention in 2018.

Season 1 (2004)

Season 2 (2005)





Revived series
After Viacom became a co-owner of the Rainbow studio in 2011, new seasons of Winx Club entered production at Viacom's Nickelodeon Animation Studio and Rainbow. In this revamped series, the Winx are once again students at Alfea, as they were before their graduation in the original show. The revival began with four specials that retell the original first and second seasons. Nickelodeon's American writers aimed to make the series multicultural and appealing toward viewers from different countries. In 2019, Straffi commented on his near-decade of collaboration with Nickelodeon, saying that "the know-how of Rainbow and the know-how of Nickelodeon are very complementary; the sensibilities of the Americans, with our European touch."

Specials (2011)



Season 6 (2014)

Season 7 (2015)

Season 8 (2019)

Reboot (2024)
In 2022, Iginio Straffi announced that "a brand new CG Winx animated series reboot is going into production. Yes, a reboot."

Films

The Secret of the Lost Kingdom (2007)

On 8 October 2006, a Winx Club CGI film was announced on Rainbow's website. The Secret of the Lost Kingdom was released in Italy on 30 November 2007. Its television premiere was on 11 March 2012 on Nickelodeon in the United States. The plot takes place after the events of the first three seasons.

Magical Adventure (2010)

In 2007, production began on a sequel to The Secret of the Lost Kingdom, before the fourth season had been written. It was released in Italy on 29 October 2010. Its television premiere was on 20 May 2013, on Nickelodeon in the United States.

The Mystery of the Abyss (2014)

In late 2010, it was announced that Viacom (the owner of Nickelodeon and eventual co-owner of Rainbow) would provide the resources necessary to produce a new Winx film. The movie follows the events of the fifth season and was released in Italy on 4 September 2014. The film made its television premiere on Nickelodeon Germany on 8 August 2015.

Notes

References

Winx Club
Winx Club
Winx Club
Winx Club
Winx Club films